The Shocker is the debut album of American rapper Silkk the Shocker, who was then known as Silkk. It was released on August 20, 1996, by No Limit Records and  Priority Records. It features production  by Beats By the Pound and guest appearances from C-Murder and Mia X among others.  The Shocker was only a mild success compared to some his future albums and made it to number 49 on the US Billboard 200 and #6 on the Top R&B/Hip-Hop Albums. As with most of No Limit's albums, this featured a lot of guest appearances from members of the record label including his brothers, Master P and C-Murder and group TRU.

Background
Planning of this album dates as far back as early 1995, as advertisements for the album can be seen on the back cover of earlier copies of Master P's 1995 album 99 Ways to Die.

Controversy

Before the album was released, the initial cover for the album had Silkk holding a 9 mm caliber outside of a TV. This is why the "Parental Advisory" logo was moved to the middle of the cover.

Track listing

Personnel 
Credits adapted by  Allmusic

Craig B. - Producer  
Big Ed - Featured Artist, Performer, Primary Artist, Vocals  
C-Murder - Featured Artist, Performer, Primary Artist, Vocals  
DJ Daryl- Producer  
Ken Franklin - Engineer, Mixing, Producer  
KLC-  Engineer Mixing, Producer  
Ken Lee -  Mastering  
Master P -  Executive Producer, Featured Artist, Guest Artist, Performer, Vocals  

Mia X - Featured Artist, Guest Artist, Performer, Primary Artist, Vocals  
Mo B. Dick -  Engineer, Featured Artist, Mixing, Performer, Producer, Vocals  
Pure Passion - Featured Artist, Performer, Primary Artist, Vocals  
Silkk the Shocker - Performer, Primary Artist  
Skull Duggrey  - Composer, Featured Artist, Guest Artist, Performer,  Vocals  
Carlos Stephens - Engineer, Mixing  
Matt Studio -  Editing  
T-Bone -  Producer  
TRU - Guest Artist

Charts

References

1996 debut albums
Silkk the Shocker albums
No Limit Records albums
Priority Records albums